Mikalai is a masculine Belarusian given name. Notable people with the name include:

Mikalai Barkouski, Belarusian judoka
Mikalai Kamianchuk (born 1987), Belarusian pair skater
Mikalai Kazak (born 1977), Belarusian trampolinist
Mikalai Novikau (born 1986), Belarusian weightlifter
Mikalai Sharlap (born 1994), Belarusian rower
Mikalai Shubianok (born 1985), Belarusian decathlete
Mikalai Zhukavets (born 1986), Belarusian windsurfer

Belarusian masculine given names